Dion Boucicault Jr. (born Darley George Boucicault; 23 May 1859 – 25 June 1929) was an actor and stage director. A son of the well-known playwright Dion Boucicault and actress Agnes Robertson, he followed his father into the theatrical profession and made a career as a character actor and a director. In addition to extensive work in the West End of London, he spent considerable time in Australia, where he went into management in the 1880s.

As an actor, his greatest successes included Trelawny of the 'Wells' and Mr. Pim Passes By. His best-known success as a manager was Peter Pan; or, the Boy Who Wouldn't Grow Up, of which he presented the premiere and many revivals. His last big success was Lilac Time in 1922.

Early life 
Boucicault was born in New York, the third child of Dion Boucicault, the well-known actor and dramatist, and his wife, Agnes Kelly née Robertson (1833–1916), who was also well known on the stage. He had two elder siblings, Dion William (1855–1876), Eva (1857–1909), and three younger siblings, Patrice (1862-?1890), Nina (1867–1950), the first actress to play Peter Pan, and Aubrey (1868–1913) a handsome and dashing matinee idol. Boucicault was educated at Esher, Cuddington and Paris, and served briefly in the militia. After his elder brother died, Boucicault adopted his name Dion.

Theatrical career 

Boucicault made his stage début in his father's play, Louis XI at Booth's Theatre in New York City on 11 October 1879. His London début was in November 1880, when he played Andy in another of his father's plays, Andy Blake. From then he was constantly on the stage either acting or directing productions. In 1881 and 1882 he appeared at the Court Theatre, and in 1883 he went on tour as the original Harry Marsland in The Private Secretary. He also adapted two plays, My Little Girl (1882) and Devotion (1884), both of which were produced at the Court. In 1885 he went to Australia with his father, and decided to remain there. He entered into partnership with Robert Brough in 1886, and at the Bijou Theatre in Melbourne and the Criterion in Sydney a long series of plays by Robertson, Pinero, Jones and other dramatists of the period was produced with great care and artistry. A fine company was assembled which included Boucicault's sister Nina, afterwards to make a reputation in London, G. S. Titheradge, and G. W. Anson. The Brough and Boucicault Comedy Company inaugurated their lesseeship and management of Her Majesty's Opera House, Melbourne, on 9 October September, 1886, by the first production in Australia of "Turned Up" by Mark Melford. Though modern comedy was usually played, there was one excursion into Shakespeare, a notable performance of Much Ado About Nothing with Titheradge as Benedick, and Mrs Brough as Beatrice.

Boucicault had invaluable experience both as a producer and as an actor, and when he returned to London in 1896 he was capable of taking any part that his lack of height, 5 ft 7 in (170 cm), did not disqualify him for. On 20 January 1898 he played one of his most successful parts, Sir William Gower, in Trelawney of the Wells, and a long succession of important parts followed, including many characters of "crusty senility". He directed the first production of Peter Pan and other well-known plays by Barrie, Milne and various leading dramatists of the time. From 1901 to 1922, Boucicault was active as a producer, first in partnership with Charles Frohman, and, after Frohman's death, on his own. His last successful production was Lilac Time in December 1922.

Boucicault visited Australia again in 1923 with his wife Irene Vanbrugh, with a repertoire which included Mr. Pim Passes By, Belinda, The Second Mrs Tanquerary, Trelawney of the Wells, His House in Order and Aren't We All. He returned to London in 1925 but was back again in Australia in 1926 (accompanied by Brian Aherne), and in South Africa in 1927, and once again in Australia and New Zealand in 1927-28 when plays by Barrie, Milne and others were staged. He played the part of the Chinese character Ong Chi Seng in the production of Somerset Maugham's play The Letter in Melbourne in 1927.

Late life and legacy 
Boucicault's health began to deteriorate in Australia, and returning to England via New Zealand, he died at his home in Berkshire on 25 June 1929, survived by his wife.

Boucicault was a great producer of comedy and paid great attention to detail. In Australia he set a standard that has seldom, if ever, been surpassed. He was a most finished actor in a wide range of parts and in his later years became the legitimate successor of Sir John Hare in playing old men's parts. News of his death in Australia had critics mourning his death.

References

External links 

Dion Boucicault Jr. portrait New York Public Library

1859 births
1929 deaths
19th-century American male actors
American male stage actors
Australian male stage actors